Philodromus praedatus is a spider species found in Europe, Russia and Azerbaijan.

See also 
 List of Philodromidae species

References

External links 

praedatus
Spiders of Europe
Spiders of Russia
Spiders of Asia
Fauna of Azerbaijan
Spiders described in 1871